My One and Only Thrill is the second studio album by American singer and songwriter Melody Gardot. It was released on March 16, 2009, by Verve Records. Three singles were released from the album: "Who Will Comfort Me", "Baby I'm a Fool", and "Your Heart Is as Black as Night". All tracks are original, except "Over the Rainbow" (originally performed by Judy Garland in the 1939 film The Wizard of Oz), which is included as a tribute to her grandmother. It features string arrangements by Vince Mendoza, who, along with producer Larry Klein, is known for his works with Joni Mitchell. My One and Only Thrill received three Grammy Award nominations: Instrumental Arrangement Accompanying Vocalist(s) for the title track (Mendoza), Best Engineered Album, Non-Classical (Helik Hadar and Al Schmitt), and Producer of the Year, Non-Classical (Klein). The album has sold over 1.5 million copies worldwide.

A deluxe edition was released in November 2009, which consists of a digipak including an orchestral version of "If the Stars Were Mine" and an additional EP with five tracks recorded live at a radio concert in Paris, as well as an extended booklet. A second deluxe addition, the Starwatch edition, was released in November 2010. This version includes three bonus "Chill Out Mix" tracks and instead of the live EP it includes the Bye Bye Blackbird EP, four tracks recorded with British jazz guitarist David Preston.

Composition
Keeping the dark piano jazz style, the album incorporates several elements of samba and Brazilian music, which Gardot considers major influences. Regarding the slightly quiet and always smooth sound, she was quoted saying that, because of her health problems, not many instruments could be used. She added that it was a very logical process. The album is mainly sung in English, except for the French-language track "Les étoiles" ("The Stars").

Critical reception

My One and Only Thrill received generally positive reviews from music critics. At Metacritic, which assigns a normalized rating out of 100 to reviews from mainstream publications, the album received an average score of 71, based on 10 reviews.

AllMusic remarked that "These are slight, subtle progressions but what impresses is how thoroughly My One and Only Thrill lives up to the promise of her debut, offering another album that is as enchanting in its sound as it is in its substance", awarding the album with four out of five stars. The Times gave the album four out of five stars and described it as "an exceptional album and anyone who thought the great age of the torch singer was long over should lend an ear". Ian Patterson writing for All About Jazz added, "Gardot blurs the line between the beauty and pain of loving; hope and hopelessness are thinly disguised mirror images, and romance can be something as elusive as mist, but yet something powerful and all consuming. These songs are poems of beautiful and affecting simplicity, and they leave a taste that is wonderfully bitter sweet."

Michael Quinn of BBC commented, "My One and Only Thrill is the spellbinding follow up to Gardot's compelling debut, Worrisome Heart, and eloquently confirms her as a supreme songwriting talent possessed of a truly sublime voice." Will Layman of PopMatters observed, "Melody Gardot is singer with a great sound -- intimate rather than overblown, tinged with smoke rather than hype, a retro-ish kind of now. My One and Only Thrill is a quiet, blue-tinged collection of ten original songs and one choice cover. It is a sophisticated, jazz-steeped pop record..."

Commercial performance
My One and Only Thrill debuted at number 42 on the US Billboard 200 with 11,000 copies sold in its first week, earning Gardot her highest-peaking album on the chart (until The Absence reached number 33 in 2012), as well as her best sales week. By April 2010, the album had sold 117,000 copies in the United States. The album debuted at number 40 on the UK Albums Chart for the week ending March 28, 2009, eventually peaking at number 12 in late May 2009. It was certified gold by the British Phonographic Industry (BPI) on July 22, 2013, denoting shipments in excess of 100,000 copies.

The album was successful across continental Europe, where it reached number one in Sweden, as well as the top five in Belgium's Wallonia region, France, Germany, and Norway, the top 10 in Denmark, and the top 20 in Finland, the Netherlands, Poland, Spain, and Switzerland. As of April 2015, My One and Only Thrill had sold over 1.5 million copies worldwide.

Track listing

Personnel
 Melody Gardot – guitar, piano, vocals
 Gary Foster – alto saxophone
 Bryan Rogers – tenor saxophone, backing vocals
 Larry Goldings – Hammond B3 organ
 Patrick Hughes – trumpet, backing vocals
 Andy Martin – trombone
 Behn Gillece – vibraphone
 Nico Abondolo – double bass
 Drew Dembowski – double bass
 Larry Klein – bass guitar, backing vocals
 Ken Pendergast – bass guitar, backing vocals
 Vinnie Colaiuta – drums
 Charlie Patierno – drums, backing vocals
 Paulinho da Costa – percussion

Strings
 Harp – Amy Shulma, Marcia Dickstein
 Cello – Ira Glansheek, Christina Soule, Cecilia Tsan, Larry Corbett
 Violin – Joel Derouin, Roberto Cani, Audrey Solomon, Darius Campo, Kevin Connolly, Katia Popov, Liane Mautner, Miran Kojian, Natalie Leggett, Robin Olson, Irina Voloshina
 Viola – Dave Walther, Roland Kato, Alma Fernandez, Samuel Formicola, Jody Rubin

Production
 Larry Klein – producer
 Helix Hadar – engineer
 Al Schmitt – mixing
 Steve Genewick – mixing

Charts

Weekly charts

Year-end charts

Certifications

Notes

References

External links

2009 albums
Albums arranged by Vince Mendoza
Albums produced by Larry Klein
Melody Gardot albums
Universal Classics and Jazz albums
Verve Records albums

Albums recorded at Capitol Studios